The 1959 Tasmanian state election was held on 2 May 1959.

Retiring Members

No MHAs retired at this election.

Redistributions and seat changes
The House of Assembly had been expanded prior to this election, with members elected from each division increased from six to seven.
Braddon Labor MHA Charley Aylett contested Denison.

House of Assembly
Sitting members are shown in bold text. Tickets that elected at least one MHA are highlighted in the relevant colour. Successful candidates are indicated by an asterisk (*).

Bass
Seven seats were up for election. The Labor Party was defending three seats, although sitting MHA Reg Turnbull was running as an independent. The Liberal Party was defending three seats. There was one new seat.

Braddon
Seven seats were up for election. The Labor Party was defending three seats. The Liberal Party was defending three seats. There was one new seat.

Denison
Seven seats were up for election. The Labor Party was defending three seats. The Liberal Party was defending three seats. There was one new seat.

Franklin
Seven seats were up for election. The Labor Party was defending three seats. The Liberal Party was defending three seats. There was one new seat.

Wilmot
Seven seats were up for election. The Labor Party was defending three seats. The Liberal Party was defending three seats. There was one new seat.

See also
 Members of the Tasmanian House of Assembly, 1956–1959
 Members of the Tasmanian House of Assembly, 1959–1964

References
Tasmanian Parliamentary Library

Candidates for Tasmanian state elections